Mayavi is a 1965 Indian Malayalam-language film, directed by G. K. Ramu and produced by P. Subramaniam. The film stars Prem Nazir, Madhu, Sheela, K. V. Shanthi, Rajalakshmi and Adoor Bhasi. The film had musical score by M. S. Baburaj.

Cast

 Prem Nazir as Raghu
 Madhu as Madhu
 Sheela as Vasanthy
 K. V. Shanthi as Jayanthi/Maalini
 Rajalakshmi
 Adoor Bhasi as Bhasi
 Kottarakkara Sreedharan Nair as Prathapan
 Aranmula Ponnamma as Raghu's mother
 Thikkurissy Sukumaran Nair as Krishna Menon
 S. P. Pillai as Kaimani
 Paravoor Bharathan as Police officer
 Sreekantan Nair
 Anandavally
 Kundara Bhasi
 Muttathara Soman
 Soman
 Vaikom Mani
 M.R Bharathan

Soundtrack

References

External links
 

1965 films
1960s Malayalam-language films